Costantino Pasqualotto, also called il Costantini (1681 - 1755) was an Italian painter of the late-Baroque period in Vicenza.

He was born in Vicenza. He was a pupil of Giulio Carpioni and under a Volpato.

References

1681 births
1755 deaths
18th-century Italian painters
Italian male painters
People from Vicenza
18th-century Italian male artists